Beyond The Embrace was an American melodic death metal band. They formed in New Bedford, Massachusetts in 2000. The band has released two albums to date, Against the Elements in 2002 and Insect Song in 2004. They were signed to Metal Blade Records. Along with vocalist and keyboardist Shawn Gallagher, bassist Chris Parlon, and drummer Chris Haskell, the band features the work of three guitarists: Alex Botelho, Oscar Gouveia, and Jeff Saude. Shawn Gallagher uses a mix of clean and harsh vocal styles. It is unknown whether the band is currently disbanded.

Current members
 Kenneth Paul Benda - vocals (2005-2011)
 Jeff Saude - guitar (2000-2011)
 Oscar Gouveia - guitar (2000-2011)
 Alex Botelho - guitar (2000-2011)
 Dan Jagoda - drums (2008-2011)
 Chris Parlon - bass (2004-2011)

Previous members
 Shawn Gallagher - vocals, keyboard (2000-2005)
 Mike Bresciani - drums (2000-2002)
 Kevin Camille - drums (2002-2005)
 Steve Bolognese - drums (2005-2007)
 Chris Haskell - drums (2007-2008)
 Adam Gonsalves - bass (2002-2004)

Studio albums
Against the Elements (2002)
Insect Song (2004)

References

Heavy metal musical groups from Massachusetts
American melodic death metal musical groups
Musical groups established in 2000
Musical groups disestablished in 2011
Metal Blade Records artists